Kim Bora (Korean: 김보라; born November 30, 1981) is a South Korean filmmaker. Her short film, The Recorder Exam won numerous awards including the Best Student Filmmaker Award from The Directors Guild of America. The film was also a National Finalist for the 2012 Student Academy Awards. Kim’s debut feature House of Hummingbird received production support from the Korean Film Council, Seoul Film Commission and Asian Cinema Fund of Busan International Film Festival. The film received post-production support from the Sundance Institute’s Feature Film Program and was selected as an IFP Narrative Lab Fellow. It premiered at the Busan International Film Festival, where it won the NETPAC award and the KNN Audience award. The film went on to collect 59 awards from prestigious festivals, including Berlinale, Tribeca, BFI London, Istanbul, Jerusalem, and a Blue Dragon award—Korea’s equivalent of an Oscar.

At the 69th Berlin International Film Festival, Kim won the Grand Prix of the Generation 14plus with House of Hummingbird.

Career 
Born in South Korea in 1981, Kim Bora graduated from Dongguk University with a degree in film. In 2007, she left for Columbia University in the U.S., and received a Masters of Fine Arts in film directing. Her film The Recorder Exam (2011) was her created graduation film project, and it won Best Student Filmmaker for the East Region from the Directors Guild of America. After the release of the film, Kim began to work on the script that would be based on her own childhood. Later, she moved back to Korea and gave lectures in the colleges where she studied.

In 2018, after seven years of working on the script and production, her debut film House of Hummingbird was released, winning multiple awards and was on a winning streak. The film also received production support from the Korean Film Council (KOFIC), Seoul Film Commission, as well as Asian Cinima Fund of Busan International Film Festival. House of Hummingbird is a coming-of-age film about a girl, Eun-hee, who was a part of the expanding 1990's economy, and, due to her flawed family, is searching for validation through love and reasons to continue living. Kim said that the incidents in this film are based on incidents and events that occurred throughout her childhood, after having a nightmare in while living in New York and decided to understand what she had gone through.

Filmography 

 The Recorder Exam (2011) - director
 House of Hummingbird (2018) - director, screenwriter, executive producer

Awards 

 2011 DGA Student Awards: Best Woman Student Filmmaker- East Region (The Recorder Exam)
 2011 Woodstock Film Festival: Best Student Short Film (The Recorder Exam)
 2018 Busan International Film Festival: KNN Award (House of Hummingbird)
 2018 Busan International Film Festival: NEPAC Award (House of Hummingbird)
 2019 Athens International Film Festival: Best Screenplay (House of Hummingbird)
 2019 Beijing International Film Festival: Forward Future Award (House of Hummingbird)
 2019 Bergen International Film Festival: Cinema Extrodinare (House of Hummingbird)
 2019 Berlin International Film Festival: Best Feature Film (House of Hummingbird)
 2019 Blue Dragon Film Awards: Best Screenplay (House of Hummingbird)
 2019 Cinema Jove-Valencia International Film Festival: Best Directing (House of Hummingbird)
 2019 Cinema Jove- Valencia International Film Festival: Best Film (House of Hummingbird)
 2019 Cyprus Film Days International Festival: Special Jury Award (House of Hummingbird)
 2019 Faro Island Film Festival: Best New Director (House of Hummingbird)
 2019 Heartland International Film Festival: Narrative Feature (House of Hummingbird)
 2019 Istanbul International Film Festival: International Competition (House of Hummingbird)
 2019 Jerusalem Film Festival: International First Film (House of Hummingbird)
 2019 Korean Association of Film Critics Awards: Best New Director (House of Hummingbird)
 2019 Korean Association of Film Critics Awards: FIPRESCI Award (House of Hummingbird)
 2019 London Film Festival: Sutherland Award (House of Hummingbird)
 2019 Malaysia Golden Globe Awards: Best Director (House of Hummingbird)
 2019 Kyiv International Film Festival "Molodist": Best Feature Film (House of Hummingbird)
 2019 Kyiv International Film Festival "Molodist": Best Film (House of Hummingbird)
 2019 Seattle International Film Festival: Best Feature Film (House of Hummingbird)
 2019 Taipei Film Festival: International New Talent Competition (House of Hummingbird)
 2019 The SACF Artist of the Year Awards: Outstanding New Artist (House of Hummingbird)
 2019 Transatlantyk Festival: Lodz: Section "New Cinema" (House of Hummingbird)
 2019 Tribeca Film Festival: Best International Narrative Feature (House of Hummingbird)
 2019 Los Angeles Asian Pacific Film Festival: Best Narrative Feature (House of Hummingbird)
 2019 Director's Cut Awards: Best New Director (House of Hummingbird)
 2019 Director's Cut Awards: Vision of the Year (House of Hummingbird)
 2020 Asian Film Critics Association Awards: Best New Director (House of Hummingbird)
 2020 Black Movie Film Festival: Young Adults Jury Award (House of Hummingbird)
 2020 Black Movie Film Festival: Critics Prize (House of Hummingbird)
 2020 Grand Bell Awards: Best New Director (House of Hummingbird)
 2020 Baeksang Arts Awards: Best Director (House of Hummingbird)

References 

South Korean women film directors
Living people
1981 births
Dankook University alumni
Columbia University School of the Arts alumni
Best Director Paeksang Arts Award (film) winners